Noarlunga is a South Australian placename which refer to several entities within the southern Adelaide metropolitan area. For all placenames including the word  Noarlunga, the etymology used for the Hundred of Noarlunga applies. Noarlunga may refer to any of the following:

 Old Noarlunga, South Australia, known as Noarlunga from 1840 until 1978
 Noarlunga Centre, South Australia, suburb established 1978
 City of Noarlunga, a former local government area
 Hundred of Noarlunga, a cadastral unit
 Noarlunga railway station (1914–1969) on Willunga railway line
 Noarlunga Centre railway station established 1978
 Noarlunga Football Club, an Australian rules football club
 Noarlunga United, a soccer football club
 Noarlunga Hospital, located in Noarlunga Centre

See also

 Noarlunga Centre, South Australia
 Noarlunga Downs, South Australia
 Port Noarlunga (disambiguation)